

Women's 50 m Breaststroke - Finals

Women's 50 m Breaststroke - Semifinals

Women's 50 m Breaststroke - Semifinal 01

Women's 50 m Breaststroke - Semifinal 02

Women's 50 m Breaststroke - Heats

Women's 50 m Breaststroke - Heat 01

Women's 50 m Breaststroke - Heat 02

Women's 50 m Breaststroke - Heat 03

Women's 50 m Breaststroke - Heat 04

50 metres breaststroke
2006 in women's swimming